The Battle of Molyatichi (Swedish: Malatitze), also known as the Battle of Dobroye, took place on August 31, 1708 at Molyatichi (present-day Belarus near the Russian border) during the Great Northern War. The Russian army of Peter the Great under the command of Mikhail Golitsyn successfully attacked the avantgarde of the Swedish Army of Charles XII under  Carl Gustaf Roos. The fighting occurred in the swamp between the rivers Belaya Natopa and Chernaya Natopa. The Swedish forces were surprised by the Russian attack in the morning fog and withdrew to the main Swedish army. The swampy landscape prevented the Russian cavalry to cut off the Swedish way of retreat. Since the attack of the main body of the Swedish army was not part of the Russian intentions at that moment, the Russians pulled back. Together with the following Battle of Lesnaya, the battle of Malatitze caused Charles XII to abort his advance to Central Russia.

References

1708 in Europe
Malatitze
Malatitze
Malatitze
Malatitze
Military history of Belarus